There are over 9,000 Grade I listed buildings in England. This is a list of these buildings and structures in the county of Dorset, grouped first by the two unitary authority areas: first Bournemouth, Christchurch and Poole, then Dorset.

Bournemouth, Christchurch and Poole

Bournemouth

|}

Christchurch

|}

Poole

|}

Dorset (unitary authority)

Eastern Dorset

|}

Northern Dorset

|}

Southern Dorset

|}

Western Dorset

|}

Southern coastal area of Weymouth and Portland

|}

Notes

See also
Grade II listed buildings in Dorset
Grade II* listed buildings in Dorset

References 
National Heritage List for England (NHLE)

External links

 
Dorset
Dorset,Grade I